Asia Network Television, often called Asia TV, is an Iraqi satellite television channel based in Baghdad, Iraq that was launched in 2012. The Executive director is Thaeer Jead Alhasnawi since June, 2020

Programs
Asia Network Television broadcasts many programs, most notably:

Talaba
Stadium
Almnawora
Swalef
Besaraha

See also

Television in Iraq

References

External links
 Asia Network Television Official website

Television stations in Iraq
Arab mass media
Arabic-language television stations
Television channels and stations established in 2012
Arab Spring and the media